Josef Vávra (born 17 March 1984) is a Czech former professional ice hockey left winger.

Vávra was selected in the eighth round, 246th overall by the Ottawa Senators in 2002 NHL Entry Draft. He played for the Tri-City Americans and the Kootenay Ice of the jWestern Hockey League before playing four games for VHK Vsetín in the Czech Extraliga. He later played for HC Sareza Ostrava in the Czech 1.liga as well as for HC Valašské Meziříčí of the Czech 2.liga.

Vávra retired from ice hockey in 2006 to work in his father’s business. His teammate from age ten through his time with VHK Vsetin, Robin Kovář, said about Vávra’s retirement, “I think he made a wrong decision to quit, but that’s life.”

Career statistics

References

External links

1984 births
Living people
Czech ice hockey left wingers
Kootenay Ice players
Ottawa Senators draft picks
Tri-City Americans players
VHK Vsetín players
People from Valašské Meziříčí
Sportspeople from the Zlín Region
Czech expatriate ice hockey players in Canada
Czech expatriate ice hockey players in the United States